Zunongwangia flava is a Gram-negative, rod-shaped, aerobic and non-spore-forming bacterium from the genus of Zunongwangia which has been isolated from the plant Salicornia europaea from the coast of the Yellow Sea.

References

Flavobacteria
Bacteria described in 2018